Shui Chuen O Estate is the largest public housing estate in Sha Tin, New Territories, Hong Kong.

The estate comprises 18 blocks offering 11,123 public rental flats. It also includes a commercial complex with 59 shops and an indoor market. The new estate sits on a hillside is linked to the lower-lying areas by footbridges and lift towers, providing easy access to Pok Hong Estate and Sha Tin Wai station.

History
The estate was built in four phases concurrently. The first phase opened for population intake in 2015.

The estate was affected by the 2015 lead in drinking water scandal.

Additionally, there have been construction quality concerns. In 2016, a tenant at Shing Chuen House discovered that the floor slab under his flat's toilet was filled with powdery gravel. The material could be dug up by hand, exposing the rebar within the floor slab. The estate was built by China State Construction, which has also been embroiled in controversy over contaminated water at Kai Ching Estate.

Houses

Features

The Shui Chuen O Shopping Centre has 59 shops.

The Shui Chuen O Market is connected to the shopping centre.

In order to facilitate pedestrian movement around the steeply sloping site, the estate design includes six lift towers, nine footbridges, and ten sets of escalators. The longest footbridge is located at the main entrance of the estate at Shui Chuen Au Street. With a length of 70 metres, it is the longest footbridge in any Hong Kong public housing estate.

Demographics
As of 20 September 2016 (before all residents had moved in), the estate had a population of 14,083.

It is designed to accommodate a population of 28,800.

Politics
Shui Chuen O Estate falls within the purview of the Sha Tin District Council. In the 2015 election it fell entirely within the Jat Min constituency, which was represented by Yau Man-chun.

For the 2019 District Council election, the estate fell within two constituencies. Most of the estate is now located in the newly created Shui Chuen O constituency, which is represented by Lo Tak-ming. The remainder falls within the Jat Chuen constituency, which is represented by Yau Man-chun.

For the Legislative Council elections, Shui Chuen O falls within the New Territories East constituency.

Transport
There is a bus terminus at the estate. It is served by two all-day Kowloon Motor Bus routes, several peak hour-only routes, and green minibuses.

It is also within walking distance of Sha Tin Wai station.

Further reading

References

External links
 

Public housing estates in Hong Kong
Sha Tin